Estadio Doce de Octubre is a multi-use stadium in Tuluá, Colombia. It is used mostly for football matches. The stadium has a capacity of 16,000 people and was built in 1967. Cortuluá plays its home matches at this stadium.

References

Sports venues completed in 1967
Football venues in Colombia
Estadio Doce De Octubre